Kileville is an unincorporated community in Darby Township, Madison County, Ohio, United States.

History

Kileville was platted on October 2, 1895, by James Kile, a farmer who owned the land.  It is located on the CSX railroad, but is only a small stop.  As of 1915, Kileville was classified as a village, and consisted of one general store, one blacksmith, one post office, and one grain elevator.

Kileville was first electrified in 1920, when a power line was extended from Plain City. As of 1921, the Kileville Lighting Company had a total of nine customers.

References

Unincorporated communities in Madison County, Ohio
Unincorporated communities in Ohio